The Overall Operational Command (OOC) was established on 29 April 2019 following the Easter Sunday Bombings bringing under its command all Sri Lanka Army, Sri Lanka Navy, Sri Lanka Air Force and Sri Lanka Police units within the Western Province and Puttalam District. The OOC comes under the Chief of Defence Staff. 

Major General Sathyapriya Liyanage Commander, Security Forces - West was appointed the first Overall Operational Commander, with Rear Admiral W.A.S.S Perera,  Air Vice Marshal W.L.R.P Rodrigo and Superintendent of Police L.K.D Anil Priyantha serving as service coordinating officers.

See also
Overall Operational Commander

References

Sri Lankan commands
2019 establishments in Sri Lanka
Organizations established in 2019
Counterterrorism in Sri Lanka